Alberto Carlos de Liz-Teixeira Branquinho (27 January 1902 in Viseu, Portugal– † 1973) was a Portuguese diplomat credited with saving the lives of 1,000 Jews in Nazi-occupied Hungary during the Holocaust from Hungarian Fascists and the Nazis during the later stages of World War II, while serving as Portugal’s Chargé d'Affaires in Budapest in 1944.

Along with Sampaio Garrido, he rented houses and apartments to shelter and protect refugees from deportation and murder. They obtained permission from the Portuguese government to issue safe conducts to all persons who had relatives in Portugal, Brazil, or the Portuguese colonies or had the most remote connection to Portugal. Garrido and Branquinho also established an office of the Portuguese Red Cross at the Portuguese legation to care for Jewish refugees. This was largely done in cooperation with the Portuguese Foreign Office and under Salazar’s direct supervision with the provision that these refugees would not try to get Portuguese citizenship.

On 23 April 1944 and following the German occupation of Hungary, the Portuguese ruler António de Oliveira Salazar decided to order his ambassador to return to Lisbon and leave Teixeira Branquinho as the chargé d'affaires,  in his place. Garrido's recall was done in response to a request from Britain and the United States who wanted neutral countries to downgrade their diplomatic presence in Hungary. In direct contact with Salazar, Branquinho issued protective passports to hundreds of Jewish families. Altogether about 1,000 lives were saved due to his actions. Branquinho was recalled to Lisbon on 30 October 1944.

After the war Branquinho continued to serve his country as a diplomat in Washington, Jakarta, Paris, Caracas, Baghdad, Teheran and the Hague, where he acted with Ambassador’s credentials. He retired in 1966.

His name has been included in The Raoul Wallenberg-memorial at the Dohány Street Synagogue in Budapest.

Branquinho's case never gained the same level of recognition as did the Aristides de Sousa Mendes', another Portuguese diplomat credited with saving Jews from the holocaust. Branquinho's case differs from that of Sousa Mendes in several ways. He was deliberately acting to save Jews and not refugees in general. He was risking his life which was not the case with Sousa Mendes. He was in the heart of a Nazi regime, in 1944, when the Holocaust was at its peek, while Sousa Mendes was at Bordeaux in 1940 long before the Holocaust had started. Branquinho had full backing from Salazar. 

Historian Tom Gallagher argues that Branquinho's case has been largely overlooked probably owing to the fact that he was coordinating his actions with Salazar and that weakens the core argument in the Sousa Mendes legend that he was defying a tyrannical superior. Gallagher argues that the disproportionate attention given to Sousa Mendes suggests that wartime history is in danger of being used in contemporary Portugal as a political weapon.

Other Portuguese diplomats that saved people during the war
Carlos Sampaio Garrido
Aristides de Sousa Mendes
Pedro Teotónio Pereira

References

Sources

 
 

1902 births
1973 deaths
People from Viseu
Portuguese diplomats
Portuguese Roman Catholics